The Duchess of Kent Military Hospital was an army hospital and nurse training facility in Catterick Garrison, North Yorkshire, England.

History 
The Duchess of Kent Military Hospital (DKMH) was opened in 1976 at a cost of £3 million, general hospital services were stopped on 1 July 1999, however it was still used as a medical facility until 2015, when services were relocated to RAF Leeming.

References 

Hospitals established in 1976
1976 establishments in England
Military hospitals in the United Kingdom
Hospitals in North Yorkshire
Defunct hospitals in England
Catterick Garrison